Treasure Raiders is a 2003 Chinese wuxia television series directed by Li Wenyan which broadcast on Beijing Television from May 2003 to June 2003. It stars Nicky Wu, Yu Bo, Athena Chu, and Ma Yashu. The series is an adaptation of Gu Long's wuxia novel of the same name. The series is produced jointly by Hainan Zhouyi Film and Television Production Company and Jiuzhou Audio and Video Publishing Company.

Cast

Main
 Nicky Wu as Xiao Shi Yi Lang
 Yu Bo as Lian Chengbi
 Athena Chu as Shen Bijun, wife of Lian Chengbi
 Ma Yashu as Feng Siniang, wife of Yang Kaitai

Supporting
 Wan Hongjie as Yang Kaitai
 Liu Sitong as Lian Chengjin
 Yang Junyi as Xue Jiu
 Zhang Jin as Xue Ying
 Zheng Yuzhi as Grandma Shen
 Cui Zhemin as Sima Xiang
 Gong Xiaohui as Su Su
 Yu Zhen as Marquis Xiaoyao 
 Li Qian as son of a high official
 Sun Baoguang as Bai Yang
 Shao Feng as Lü Liu
 Zhang Zhichao as Ni Qiu
 Cao Xiwen as Ding Xiang

Soundtrack

References

External links
 

2003 Chinese television series debuts
2003 Chinese television series endings
Television shows based on Chinese novels
Chinese romance television series
Chinese wuxia television series
Gu Long